The 2023 Atlanta Braves season will be the 153rd season of the Atlanta Braves franchise, the 58th in Atlanta, and the Braves' seventh season at Truist Park. The Braves are managed by Brian Snitker, in his eighth season as the team’s manager.

Offseason

Rule changes 
Pursuant to the CBA, new rule changes will be in place for the 2023 season:

 institution of a pitch clock between pitches;
 limits on pickoff attempts per plate appearance;
 limits on defensive shifts requiring two infielders to be on either side of second and be within the boundary of the infield; and
 larger bases (increased to 18-inch squares);

Regular season

Game Log 

|- style="background:
| 1 || March 30 || @ Nationals || – || || || — || || – ||
|- style="background:
| 2 || April 1 || @ Nationals || – || || || — || || – ||
|- style="background:
| 3 || April 2 || @ Nationals || – || || || — || || – ||
|- style="background:
| 4 || April 3 || @ Cardinals || – || || || — || || – ||
|- style="background:
| 5 || April 4 || @ Cardinals || – || || || — || || – ||
|- style="background:
| 6 || April 5 || @ Cardinals || – || || || — || || – ||
|- style="background:
| 7 || April 6 || Padres || – || || || — || || – ||
|- style="background:
| 8 || April 7 || Padres || – || || || — || || – ||
|- style="background:
| 9 || April 8 || Padres || – || || || — || || – ||
|- style="background:
| 10 || April 9 || Padres || – || || || — || || – ||
|- style="background:
| 11 || April 10 || Reds || – || || || — || || – ||
|- style="background:
| 12 || April 11 || Reds || – || || || — || || – ||
|- style="background:
| 13 || April 12 || Reds || – || || || — || || – ||
|- style="background:
| 14 || April 14 || @ Royals || – || || || — || || – ||
|- style="background:
| 15 || April 15 || @ Royals || – || || || — || || – ||
|- style="background:
| 16 || April 16 || @ Royals || – || || || — || || – ||
|- style="background:
| 17 || April 17 || @ Padres || – || || || — || || – ||
|- style="background:
| 18 || April 18 || @ Padres || – || || || — || || – ||
|- style="background:
| 19 || April 19 || @ Padres || – || || || — || || – ||
|- style="background:
| 20 || April 21 || Astros || – || || || — || || – ||
|- style="background:
| 21 || April 22 || Astros || – || || || — || || – ||
|- style="background:
| 22 || April 23 || Astros || – || || || — || || – ||
|- style="background:
| 23 || April 24 || Marlins || – || || || — || || – ||
|- style="background:
| 24 || April 25 || Marlins || – || || || — || || – ||
|- style="background:
| 25 || April 26 || Marlins || – || || || — || || – ||
|- style="background:
| 26 || April 27 || Marlins || – || || || — || || – ||
|- style="background:
| 27 || April 28 || @ Mets || – || || || — || || – ||
|- style="background:
| 28 || April 29 || @ Mets || – || || || — || || – ||
|- style="background:
| 29 || April 30 || @ Mets || – || || || — || || – ||
|-

|- style="background:
| 30 || May 1 || @ Mets || – || || || — || || – ||
|- style="background:
| 31 || May 2 || @ Marlins || – || || || — || || – ||
|- style="background:
| 32 || May 3 || @ Marlins || – || || || — || || – ||
|- style="background:
| 33 || May 4 || @ Marlins || – || || || — || || – ||
|- style="background:
| 34 || May 5 || Orioles || – || || || — || || – ||
|- style="background:
| 35 || May 6 || Orioles || – || || || — || || – ||
|- style="background:
| 36 || May 7 || Orioles || – || || || — || || – ||
|- style="background:
| 37 || May 9 || Red Sox || – || || || — || || – ||
|- style="background:
| 38 || May 10 || Red Sox || – || || || — || || – ||
|- style="background:
| 39 || May 12 || @ Blue Jays || – || || || — || || – ||
|- style="background:
| 40 || May 13 || @ Blue Jays || – || || || — || || – ||
|- style="background:
| 41 || May 14 || @ Blue Jays || – || || || — || || – ||
|- style="background:
| 42 || May 15 || @ Rangers || – || || || — || || – ||
|- style="background:
| 43 || May 16 || @ Rangers || – || || || — || || – ||
|- style="background:
| 44 || May 17 || @ Rangers || – || || || — || || – ||
|- style="background:
| 45 || May 19 || Mariners || – || || || — || || – ||
|- style="background:
| 46 || May 20 || Mariners || – || || || — || || – ||
|- style="background:
| 47 || May 21 || Mariners || – || || || — || || – ||
|- style="background:
| 48 || May 22 || Dodgers || – || || || — || || – ||
|- style="background:
| 49 || May 23 || Dodgers || – || || || — || || – ||
|- style="background:
| 50 || May 24 || Dodgers || – || || || — || || – ||
|- style="background:
| 51 || May 25 || Phillies || – || || || — || || – ||
|- style="background:
| 52 || May 26 || Phillies || – || || || — || || – ||
|- style="background:
| 53 || May 27 || Phillies || – || || || — || || – ||
|- style="background:
| 54 || May 28 || Phillies || – || || || — || || – ||
|- style="background:
| 55 || May 29 || @ Athletics || – || || || — || || – ||
|- style="background:
| 56 || May 30 || @ Athletics || – || || || — || || – ||
|- style="background:
| 57 || May 31 || @ Athletics || – || || || — || || – ||
|-

|- style="background:
| 58 || June 2 || @ Diamondbacks || – || || || — || || – ||
|- style="background:
| 59 || June 3 || @ Diamondbacks || – || || || — || || – ||
|- style="background:
| 60 || June 4 || @ Diamondbacks || – || || || — || || – ||
|- style="background:
| 61 || June 6 || Mets || – || || || — || || – ||
|- style="background:
| 62 || June 7 || Mets || – || || || — || || – ||
|- style="background:
| 63 || June 8 || Mets || – || || || — || || – ||
|- style="background:
| 64 || June 9 || Nationals || – || || || — || || – ||
|- style="background:
| 65 || June 10 || Nationals || – || || || — || || – ||
|- style="background:
| 66 || June 11 || Nationals || – || || || — || || – ||
|- style="background:
| 67 || June 12 || @ Tigers || – || || || — || || – ||
|- style="background:
| 68 || June 13 || @ Tigers || – || || || — || || – ||
|- style="background:
| 69 || June 14 || @ Tigers || – || || || — || || – ||
|- style="background:
| 70 || June 15 || Rockies || – || || || — || || – ||
|- style="background:
| 71 || June 16 || Rockies || – || || || — || || – ||
|- style="background:
| 72 || June 17 || Rockies || – || || || — || || – ||
|- style="background:
| 73 || June 18 || Rockies || – || || || — || || – ||
|- style="background:
| 74 || June 20 || @ Phillies || – || || || — || || – ||
|- style="background:
| 75 || June 21 || @ Phillies || – || || || — || || – ||
|- style="background:
| 76 || June 22 || @ Phillies || – || || || — || || – ||
|- style="background:
| 77 || June 23 || @ Reds || – || || || — || || – ||
|- style="background:
| 78 || June 24 || @ Reds || – || || || — || || – ||
|- style="background:
| 79 || June 25 || @ Reds || – || || || — || || – ||
|- style="background:
| 80 || June 26 || Twins || – || || || — || || – ||
|- style="background:
| 81 || June 27 || Twins || – || || || — || || – ||
|- style="background:
| 82 || June 28 || Twins || – || || || — || || – ||
|- style="background:
| 83 || June 30 || Marlins || – || || || — || || – ||
|-

|- style="background:
| 84 || July 1 || Marlins || – || || || — || || – ||
|- style="background:
| 85 || July 2 || Marlins || – || || || — || || – ||
|- style="background:
| 86 || July 3 || @ Guardians || – || || || — || || – ||
|- style="background:
| 87 || July 4 || @ Guardians || – || || || — || || – ||
|- style="background:
| 88 || July 5 || @ Guardians || – || || || — || || – ||
|- style="background:
| 89 || July 7 || @ Rays || – || || || — || || – ||
|- style="background:
| 90 || July 8 || @ Rays || – || || || — || || – ||
|- style="background:
| 91 || July 9 || @ Rays || – || || || — || || – ||
|- style="background:#bbcaff;"
| – || July 11 || colspan="10" | 93rd All-Star Game: Seattle, WA
|- style="background:
| 92 || July 14 || White Sox || – || || || — || || – ||
|- style="background:
| 93 || July 15 || White Sox || – || || || — || || – ||
|- style="background:
| 94 || July 16 || White Sox || – || || || — || || – ||
|- style="background:
| 95 || July 18 || Diamondbacks || – || || || — || || – ||
|- style="background:
| 96 || July 19 || Diamondbacks || – || || || — || || – ||
|- style="background:
| 97 || July 20 || Diamondbacks || – || || || — || || – ||
|- style="background:
| 98 || July 21 || @ Brewers || – || || || — || || – ||
|- style="background:
| 99 || July 22 || @ Brewers || – || || || — || || – ||
|- style="background:
| 100 || July 23 || @ Brewers || – || || || — || || – ||
|- style="background:
| 101 || July 25 || @ Red Sox || – || || || — || || – ||
|- style="background:
| 102 || July 26 || @ Red Sox || – || || || — || || – ||
|- style="background:
| 103 || July 28 || Brewers || – || || || — || || – ||
|- style="background:
| 104 || July 29 || Brewers || – || || || — || || – ||
|- style="background:
| 105 || July 30 || Brewers || – || || || — || || – ||
|- style="background:
| 106 || July 31 || Angels || – || || || — || || – ||
|-

|- style="background:
| 107 || August 1 || Angels || – || || || — || || – ||
|- style="background:
| 108 || August 2 || Angels || – || || || — || || – ||
|- style="background:
| 109 || August 4 || @ Cubs || – || || || — || || – ||
|- style="background:
| 110 || August 5 || @ Cubs || – || || || — || || – ||
|- style="background:
| 111 || August 6 || @ Cubs || – || || || — || || – ||
|- style="background:
| 112 || August 7 || @ Pirates || – || || || — || || – ||
|- style="background:
| 113 || August 8 || @ Pirates || – || || || — || || – ||
|- style="background:
| 114 || August 9 || @ Pirates || – || || || — || || – ||
|- style="background:
| 115 || August 10 || @ Pirates || – || || || — || || – ||
|- style="background:
| 116 || August 11 || @ Mets || – || || || — || || – ||
|- style="background:
| 117 || August 12 || @ Mets || – || || || — || || – ||
|- style="background:
| 118 || August 13 || @ Mets || – || || || — || || – ||
|- style="background:
| 119 || August 14 || Yankees || – || || || — || || – ||
|- style="background:
| 120 || August 15 || Yankees || – || || || — || || – ||
|- style="background:
| 121 || August 16 || Yankees || – || || || — || || – ||
|- style="background:
| 122 || August 18 || Giants || – || || || — || || – ||
|- style="background:
| 123 || August 19 || Giants || – || || || — || || – ||
|- style="background:
| 124 || August 20 || Giants || – || || || — || || – ||
|- style="background:
| 125 || August 21 || Mets || – || || || — || || – ||
|- style="background:
| 126 || August 22 || Mets || – || || || — || || – ||
|- style="background:
| 127 || August 23 || Mets || – || || || — || || – ||
|- style="background:
| 128 || August 25 || @ Giants || – || || || — || || – ||
|- style="background:
| 129 || August 26 || @ Giants || – || || || — || || – ||
|- style="background:
| 130 || August 27 || @ Giants || – || || || — || || – ||
|- style="background:
| 131 || August 28 || @ Rockies || – || || || — || || – ||
|- style="background:
| 132 || August 29 || @ Rockies || – || || || — || || – ||
|- style="background:
| 133 || August 30 || @ Rockies || – || || || — || || – ||
|- style="background:
| 134 || August 31 || @ Dodgers || – || || || — || || – ||
|-

|- style="background:
| 135 || September 1 || @ Dodgers || – || || || — || || – ||
|- style="background:
| 136 || September 2 || @ Dodgers || – || || || — || || – ||
|- style="background:
| 137 || September 3 || @ Dodgers || – || || || — || || – ||
|- style="background:
| 138 || September 5 || Cardinals || – || || || — || || – ||
|- style="background:
| 139 || September 6 || Cardinals || – || || || — || || – ||
|- style="background:
| 140 || September 7 || Cardinals || – || || || — || || – ||
|- style="background:
| 141 || September 8 || Pirates || – || || || — || || – ||
|- style="background:
| 142 || September 9 || Pirates || – || || || — || || – ||
|- style="background:
| 143 || September 10 || Pirates || – || || || — || || – ||
|- style="background:
| 144 || September 12 || @ Phillies || – || || || — || || – ||
|- style="background:
| 145 || September 13 || @ Phillies || – || || || — || || – ||
|- style="background:
| 146 || September 14 || @ Phillies || – || || || — || || – ||
|- style="background:
| 147 || September 15 || @ Marlins || – || || || — || || – ||
|- style="background:
| 148 || September 16 || @ Marlins || – || || || — || || – ||
|- style="background:
| 149 || September 17 || @ Marlins || – || || || — || || – ||
|- style="background:
| 150 || September 18 || Phillies || – || || || — || || – ||
|- style="background:
| 151 || September 19 || Phillies || – || || || — || || – ||
|- style="background:
| 152 || September 20 || Phillies || – || || || — || || – ||
|- style="background:
| 153 || September 21 || @ Nationals || – || || || — || || – ||
|- style="background:
| 154 || September 22 || @ Nationals || – || || || — || || – ||
|- style="background:
| 155 || September 23 || @ Nationals || – || || || — || || – ||
|- style="background:
| 156 || September 24 || @ Nationals || – || || || — || || – ||
|- style="background:
| 157 || September 26 || Cubs || – || || || — || || – ||
|- style="background:
| 158 || September 27 || Cubs || – || || || — || || – ||
|- style="background:
| 159 || September 28 || Cubs || – || || || — || || – ||
|- style="background:
| 160 || September 29 || Nationals || – || || || — || || – ||
|- style="background:
| 161 || September 30 || Nationals || – || || || — || || – ||
|- style="background:
| 162 || October 1 || Nationals || – || || || — || || – ||
|-

Roster

Standings

National League East

National League Wild Card

Farm system

References

External links
2023 Atlanta Braves season at Baseball Reference

Atlanta Braves seasons
Atlanta Braves
Atlanta Braves